HMM Algeciras is one of the world's largest container ships. Built by  Daewoo Shipbuilding & Marine Engineering in South Korea. The ship has a capacity of 23,964 TEU. HMM Algeciras is registered in Panama and operated by HMM Co Ltd.

The "HMM Algeciras" is, along her 6 sisters and 5 "step-sisters" ("HMM Oslo"-class), deployed on the FE4 service of THE ALLIANCE between Asia and Europe, having the largest capacity deployed. Port rotation Qingdao-Pusan-Ningbo-Shanghai-Yantian-Suez Canal-Algeciras-Rotterdam-Hamburg-Antwerp-Tangiers Med-Suez Canal-Singapore-Qingdao.

References

Container ships
2020 ships